"The Day of the Doctor" is a special episode of the British science fiction television programme Doctor Who, marking the programme's 50th anniversary. It was written by Steven Moffat, an executive producer alongside Faith Penhale. It was shown on BBC One on 23 November 2013, in both 2D and 3D. The special was broadcast simultaneously in 94 countries, and was shown concurrently in 3D in some cinemas. It achieved the Guinness World Record for the largest ever simulcast of a TV drama and won the Radio Times Audience Award at the 2014 British Academy Television Awards.

The 77-minute episode shows the last day of the Time War, in which the War Doctor chooses to kill both Daleks and his own race of Time Lords to end the destructive conflict, paralleling this with a present-day choice by paramilitary organisation UNIT to destroy London rather than allow an alien invasion. Revising the backstory, the Doctor succumbs to Clara Oswald's plea to change his mind; and instead he freezes his war-torn home planet in a single moment in time and hides it in a pocket universe, rather than destroy it. However, the time distortions incurred causes all but his latest incarnation to have no memory of the changed decision.

The episode starred Matt Smith as the Eleventh Doctor and Jenna Coleman as his companion, Clara Oswald. Previous lead actors David Tennant and Billie Piper returned for the episode, Tennant reprising his role as the Tenth Doctor, while Piper portrayed a sentient doomsday weapon called the Moment, projected as an image based on her character Rose Tyler. She is invisible and inaudible to everyone but the War Doctor (John Hurt). Other appearances included a brief glimpse of the then-upcoming Twelfth Doctor (Peter Capaldi), and a guest appearance by Fourth Doctor actor Tom Baker, in his late 70s. Rounding out the guest cast were Joanna Page as Queen Elizabeth I and Jemma Redgrave as Kate Stewart, the daughter of 1970s central figure Brigadier Lethbridge-Stewart. The special also featured the appearance of the Daleks and the return of the Zygons, shape-shifting aliens who had previously appeared only in Terror of the Zygons (1975).

As the episode celebrates 50 years of the programme, it references and alludes to various concepts featured throughout the show's run. It received critical acclaim and has been described by producer Marcus Wilson as a "love letter to the fans" and then-BBC One controller Danny Cohen as an "event drama".

Mini-episodes

Two mini-episodes written by Steven Moffat, "The Night of the Doctor" (14 November 2013) and "The Last Day" (21 November 2013), were released shortly prior to "The Day of the Doctor", depicting in-series events occurring during the Time War between the Doctor's own race of Time Lords and his nemesis, the Daleks.

"The Night of the Doctor" depicts the Eighth Doctor's regeneration into the War Doctor. After being resurrected temporarily by the Sisterhood of Karn in the aftermath of a spaceship crash, the Doctor is persuaded by the sisters to take action to end the Time War, offering him a selection of potions to control his regeneration.

"The Last Day" is filmed from the first-person perspective of a soldier who has had a camera implanted in his head when the Gallifrey city of Arcadia falls to the Daleks. The "Fall of Arcadia" becomes the central battle of the Time War around which "The Day of the Doctor" is centred.

Plot

In the midst of the Time War between the Time Lords and the Daleks, the War Doctor — an incarnation of the Doctor about 400 years younger than the Eleventh Doctor — decides to trigger an ancient and sentient weapon called the Moment to destroy both sides. The Moment's humanoid interface, resembling Rose Tyler, shows what the War Doctor's future would be after the Time Lords are destroyed but the Doctor survives. The Moment opens a fissure linking the War Doctor to the Tenth and Eleventh Doctors in 1562 England. In 1562, the Zygons enter three-dimensional paintings made with the Time Lords' stasis cubes, and go into suspended animation to emerge in the present. After breaking out of the paintings in the National Gallery in the present, the Zygons take the forms of members of the military organisation UNIT so that they can utilise weapons and technology kept by UNIT in the Tower of London.

UNIT head Kate Stewart starts a countdown for a nuclear warhead beneath the Tower that will destroy the advanced technology along with London. The Doctors, unable to land a TARDIS in the Tower, use the stasis cube technology to enter a painting. They exit the painting in the Tower in the present and use UNIT's mind-wiping equipment to render the UNIT members and Zygons temporarily unaware which of them are which. The countdown is stopped and all present negotiate a peace treaty.

The War Doctor, convinced that detonating the Moment will save many more lives in the longer term, returns to his time. The other two Doctors follow him with the intention of helping him detonate the Moment. When Clara Oswald insists they do not destroy their people, the Doctors devise an alternative solution. The Doctors, aided by ten of their other incarnations, plan to use the stasis technology to freeze Gallifrey in a pocket universe. When Gallifrey disappears, the surrounding Dalek warships obliterate themselves in the inevitable crossfire.

After Gallifrey disappears, the Doctors and Clara return to the Gallery, unsure whether the plan worked. The War and Tenth Doctors learn from the Eleventh Doctor that, due to their time streams being "out of sync" with his, they will not remember what happened. The War Doctor begins to regenerate after leaving. Hinting that the plan worked, the gallery's curator, who resembles the Doctor's fourth incarnation, reveals to the Eleventh Doctor that one of the three-dimensional paintings is called "Gallifrey Falls No More". The Eleventh Doctor vows to find Gallifrey.

Continuity
As the show's 50th anniversary special, the episode contains a multitude of references to previous episodes. It opens with the title sequence and theme arrangement used at the series' debut in 1963. Echoing the opening of "An Unearthly Child", the first episode of the first Doctor Who serial, a policeman is shown walking past the sign for I.M. Foreman, the scrap merchant in whose yard the TARDIS was located, and its first few seconds are in monochrome (as had been the case in The Two Doctors (1985), the last time more than one Doctor had featured in an official story). Coal Hill School, which the Doctor's granddaughter Susan Foreman attended when they were on Earth in 1963 in the very first story, is shown to be the school Clara teaches at; it also featured in the 1988 serial Remembrance of the Daleks. According to the school sign, the chairman of the school governors is now Ian Chesterton, one of the First Doctor's original three companions and a science teacher at the school, and the headmaster is W. Coburn, a reference to Waris Hussein and Anthony Coburn, who respectively directed and wrote An Unearthly Child. Clara rides out of Coal Hill School on the Eleventh Doctor's anti-gravity motorcycle from "The Bells of Saint John" (2013) at 5:16, the time An Unearthly Child originally aired on BBC TV (the first broadcast began 1 minute 20 seconds after its scheduled time of 17:15 GMT on 23 November 1963).

When the TARDIS is picked up by UNIT, the call sign used by the helicopter to refer to UNIT is "Greyhound leader", reflecting the character of Brigadier Lethbridge-Stewart, whose daughter Kate is now portrayed as having his role as commander of UNIT. Lethbridge-Stewart was a central character in the Third Doctor's era and also several of his successors', originally appearing in the Second Doctor serial The Web of Fear (1968) and making his last appearance in Doctor Who in Seventh Doctor serial Battlefield (1989), which is also referenced. The UNIT dating controversy, regarding whether the Third Doctor era stories took place in the 1970s or 1980s, is alluded to in dialogue by Kate Stewart, when she mentions that previous events occurred either in "the '70s or '80s depending on the dating protocol".

The Tenth Doctor's era is also heavily revisited. The Moment device was originally mentioned in "The End of Time" (2009–2010), but had not been explored in depth until now, where it takes the form of "Bad Wolf", a seemingly omnipotent being and personalisation of the Time Vortex itself, which manifested in Rose Tyler when she absorbed the Time Vortex in the first series finale, "The Parting of the Ways" (2005). The Tenth Doctor also mentioned the Fall of Arcadia in "Doomsday" (2006). His marriage to Queen Elizabeth I, mentioned in "The Shakespeare Code" (2007) and "The End of Time", is depicted. When the Eleventh Doctor tells Clara that the situation is "timey-wimey", and the War Doctor ridicules him for it, the Tenth Doctor remarks, "I've no idea where he picks that stuff up"; the Tenth Doctor originally used the phrase in "Blink" (2007). During the negotiations with the Zygons, Kate mentions the Sycorax from "The Christmas Invasion" (2005). When he leaves after learning of Trenzalore, the Tenth Doctor remarks, "I don't want to go", his final words before his regeneration in "The End of Time"; the Eleventh Doctor tells Clara that "he always says that" after his TARDIS leaves.

The Tower of London's Black Archive, containing alien artefacts collected by UNIT, has photographs of the Doctor's many former companions. Additionally, River Song's high heels from "The Time of Angels"/"Flesh and Stone" (2010), the mass canceler from second series finale "Doomsday" (2006), a Supreme Dalek head from fourth series finale, "The Stolen Earth"/"Journey's End" (2008), a Dalek tommy gun from "Daleks in Manhattan"/"Evolution of the Daleks" (2007), the restraining chair which held both the Master and the Doctor in "The End of Time", and a Cyberman head are contained within the Archive. The vortex manipulator in the Archive was donated to UNIT by Captain Jack Harkness, a companion of the Ninth Doctor who was reunited with the Tenth Doctor on multiple occasions. The Black Archive was also seen in The Sarah Jane Adventures story Enemy of the Bane (2008).

Other references are made to previous multi-Doctor anniversary stories, The Three Doctors (1972–1973) and The Five Doctors (1983). Some of the Brigadier's dialogue from the former serial is alluded to when Kate asks for an incident report code-named "Cromer"; in the earlier story, upon being transported to another universe, the Brigadier initially believes himself to be near the coastal Norfolk town. When the War Doctor appears with the Tenth and Eleventh Doctors in 1562, Clara remarks, "I think there's three of them now," to which Kate responds, "There's a precedent for that," in reference to The Three Doctors. The Eleventh Doctor's dismissal of the Tenth and War Doctors as "sandshoes and grandad" to mock their respective footwear and age echo the First Doctor's description of his two successors in The Three Doctors as "a dandy and a clown"; the War Doctor's initial incredulous reaction upon hearing his description also reflects this moment. When all of the Doctors unite to freeze Gallifrey, the General says, "I didn't know when I was well-off. All twelve of them." which recalls one of the Brigadier's lines from The Three Doctors: "Three of them, eh? I didn't know when I was well off." A line of the First Doctor's from The Five Doctors is also reused near the end of the episode, when the Tenth Doctor tells the Eleventh, "It's good to know my future is in safe hands" (similar to what the First told the Fifth Doctor in the earlier story).

Lines from past serials reappear in the special. The Eleventh Doctor resurrects the phrase "reverse the polarity", associated with the Third Doctor, to comical effect. In trying to compensate for the presence of three Doctors who utilise different console rooms, the Tenth Doctor's TARDIS console briefly changes to the War Doctor's console room, seen again later in the episode, before settling on the Eleventh's. The Tenth Doctor proceeds to say, "Oh you've redecorated! I don't like it", a line originally used by the Second Doctor when remarking on the Third Doctor's TARDIS interior in The Three Doctors and later reused by the Second and Eleventh Doctors respectively in The Five Doctors and "Closing Time" (2011). One of the War Doctor's final lines of dialogue prior to regenerating is "wearing a bit thin", echoing some of the First Doctor's final words prior to regenerating at the end of The Tenth Planet (1966), "this old body of mine is wearing a bit thin".

The Moment's description of the TARDIS' sound as a "wheezing, groaning sound" is a reference to its frequent description in the Target novelisations.

Cast

The Doctor
 Matt Smith as the Eleventh Doctor.
 David Tennant as the Tenth Doctor. Archival footage notwithstanding, Tennant had not appeared in Doctor Who since his final regular appearance in "The End of Time".
 John Hurt as the War Doctor, the Doctor's forgotten warrior-like incarnation. Within the series' narrative, the War Doctor existed between the Eighth and Ninth Doctors, and renounced the title of "The Doctor".
 Christopher Eccleston, Paul McGann, Sylvester McCoy, Colin Baker, Peter Davison, Tom Baker, Jon Pertwee, Patrick Troughton and William Hartnell as the Ninth, Eighth, Seventh, Sixth, Fifth, Fourth, Third, Second and First Doctors. Archive footage of all the actors was used. Collectively credited as "The Doctor" alongside Smith, Tennant and Hurt.
 John Guilor provided some voice-over work for the First Doctor, imitating Hartnell's voice.
 Peter Capaldi as the Twelfth Doctor is seen in a fleeting and uncredited appearance (hand, eyes and forehead only); he took over the lead role from Smith in the 2013 Christmas special, "The Time of the Doctor".
 Tom Baker also makes an uncredited appearance as the Curator, a mysterious character who informs the Eleventh Doctor of Gallifrey's survival at the end of the episode. His resemblance to the Fourth Doctor is alluded to, but left unexplained.

Other cast members

Jenna Coleman as companion Clara Oswald. The special was the first time the actress was credited on the show simply as Jenna Coleman, dropping the Louise part of her name seen in previous episodes.
 Billie Piper as the likeness of Rose Tyler, which is used as the interface of The Moment, a sentient Gallifreyan weapon of mass destruction.
 Jemma Redgrave as the Brigadier's daughter Kate Stewart, who previously appeared in "The Power of Three", having been originated by actress Beverley Cressman in the direct-to-video spin-offs, Downtime and Dæmos Rising. Redgrave also portrays the Zygon impersonating Stewart.
 Joanna Page as Queen Elizabeth I and her Zygon duplicate. Page is the third actress to portray Elizabeth I on Doctor Who, following Vivienne Bennet (The Chase) and Angela Pleasence ("The Shakespeare Code").
 Ingrid Oliver as Osgood and her Zygon duplicate. Throughout the special, Osgood is seen wearing a copy of the Fourth Doctor's iconic scarf.
 Peter de Jersey as Androgar, a Time Lord.
Ken Bones as the General of Gallifrey.
 Jonjo O'Neill as McGilliop.
 Aidan Cook and Paul Kasey as the Zygons.
 Nicholas Briggs as the voice of the Daleks and the Zygons.
 Barnaby Edwards and Nicholas Pegg as Daleks.

Production

Casting
On 30 March 2013, a distribution error occurred, and many subscribers to Doctor Who Magazine received the issue five days before the official release date. The issue of the magazine included the official announcement that David Tennant and Billie Piper, who previously played the Tenth Doctor and Rose Tyler in Doctor Who respectively, were lined up to appear in the special, along with actor John Hurt. Moffat did not want to bring Rose the character back because he felt her story was wrapped up and did not feel comfortable adding to his predecessor Russell T Davies' arc. However, he liked the concept of bringing back her Bad Wolf persona and felt that Piper needed to be in the special as she symbolised the rebirth of Doctor Who.

John Hurt did not actually audition for the part, but had been asked by the production team and "said yes with remarkable speed". His costume was meant to signify that he was "rougher, tougher", and had been around for a while; the audience had missed a lot. Hurt's request to keep his beard adds to this effect.

Christopher Eccleston discussed plans for the anniversary episode with Moffat, but eventually declined to return as the Ninth Doctor. Eccleston would later state that he declined due to a combination of not doing "justice to the Ninth Doctor", as well as still being hurt by BBC's actions during his tenure.

On 20 November 2013, Tom Baker, who portrayed the Fourth Doctor, announced that he would appear in the special, stating, "I am in the special. I'm not supposed to tell you that, but I tell you that very willingly and specifically; the BBC told me not to tell anybody but I'm telling you straight away." Baker appeared as the Curator of the National Gallery, who openly discusses his resemblance to the Fourth Doctor.

Writing

"The Day of the Doctor" was written by Steven Moffat, the then head writer of Doctor Who, and produced by Marcus Wilson with Nick Hurran directing. Moffat was developing ideas for the 50th anniversary episode as early as late 2011, when he stated that the team "knew what [they] want[ed] to do" and were "revving up" for the episode in an interview discussing his work on the 2011 film The Adventures of Tintin, and began writing the script for "The Day of the Doctor" in late 2012, announcing that, as a security precaution, he had not produced any copies, instead keeping it on his computer "under lock and key" until it was needed. Moffat stated prior to the episode's release, "Most things that have been said about the 50th are not true... Normally I am responsible for the disinformation and the rubbish rumors—I usually put them out myself, but I haven't needed to for this one." On the importance of the episode, Moffat has stated that it would "change the narrative" of Doctor Who.

Moffat stated in an interview with Doctor Who Magazine that he initially began the story process with the idea that it would be the Ninth Doctor, played by Christopher Eccleston, that would have been the incarnation that ended the Time War, in spite of misgivings in his own mind regarding it:

Once it became clear that Eccleston would decline to appear, Moffat turned to an alternative concept he had been formulating, featuring a "mayfly Doctor" who appears for a single episode, asking, "Would it be weird in the run of the series to have the 45th Doctor turn up and be played by Johnny Depp or someone? Would that be a cool thing to do?". He also indicated that the "classic Doctor" he would most like to feature in a new story was William Hartnell's First Doctor, stating, "You'd want him to come and say 'What in the name of God have I turned into?' That's the confrontation that you most want to see, to celebrate 50 years. Going round and round in circles on it I just thought, 'What about a Doctor that he never talks about?' And what if it is a Doctor who's done something terrible, who's much deadlier and more serious, who represents that thing that is the undertow in both David and Matt. You know there's a terrible old man inside them. Well, here he is, facing the children he becomes, as it were." Due in part to the stress surrounding planning the episode,  Moffat has gone on record as stating that Series 7 was his least favorite to work on.

Moffat felt that it was important to bring something different to the return of Billie Piper, as she had returned as Rose Tyler in various cameo appearances throughout series 4, most prominently in "The Stolen Earth"/"Journey's End", in which she had a central role, and "The End of Time". This led to the development of the Moment, which had previously been referenced in "The End of Time". Piper agreed with Moffat's sentiments, despite loving the character of Rose.

Although Smith and Tennant ended up co-starring in the episode, neither actor was under contract for the series at the time, and at one point Moffat devised a plotline featuring Coleman as the sole regular cast member in case either declined. Knowing that Matt Smith was planning to leave, Moffat wrote the special specifically with the brief appearance of the Twelfth Doctor during the sequence of all of the Doctors uniting to save Gallifrey, prior to casting anyone in the role. Moffat later stated that it was his "plan from the start" that all the Doctors would fly in to save Gallifrey, and he knew there would be a new one at that time. He wrote it before knowing who would be cast.

Moffat explained his choice of title to SFX magazine, commenting that "... it's very rare in Doctor Who that the story happens to the Doctor. It happens to people around him, and he helps out – he's the hero figure who rides in and saves everybody from the story of the week. He is not the story of the week. In this, he is the story of the week. This is the day of the Doctor. This is his most important day. His most important moment. This is the one he'll remember, whereas I often think the Doctor wanders back to his TARDIS and forgets all about it."

Filming
Because "The Day of the Doctor" was filmed in 3D, the episode took longer than usual to shoot, and every CGI shot had to be rendered twice.

"The Day of the Doctor" took approximately five weeks in 2013 to film; regular filming began on 28 March 2013 and ended on 4 May. The first three days of shooting—28 March, 29 March, and 1 April—took place entirely at the show's Roath Lock studios in Porth Teigr, Cardiff Bay; some of the scenes set in the National Gallery and the Eleventh Doctor's TARDIS were filmed in the period.

Filming for the episode's outdoor scenes began on 2 April 2013. The first outdoor scene was filmed at the Ivy Tower in Tonna, Neath. The outdoor section of the scene involving Clara driving her motorcycle into the TARDIS, as well as the beginning of the sequence in which UNIT airlifts the TARDIS via helicopter, was filmed on Gelligaer Common Road in Bedlinog. The remainder of the latter scene was later filmed on 6 April at MOD St Athan, and on 9 April in Trafalgar Square, London.

On 17 April 2013, Smith, Coleman, Piper and Tennant filmed scenes in Chepstow, Monmouthshire, and some scenes were shot in Chepstow Castle. On 2 May 2013, filming took place in Cardiff for scenes that take place at Totter's Lane and Coal Hill School, locations which had previously featured in the first 1963 serial An Unearthly Child, the 1985 serial  Attack of the Cybermen, and the 1988 serial Remembrance of the Daleks. Filming for the special was completed on Sunday 5 May 2013, with the final two days taken with the production of the special mini-episode "The Night of the Doctor", which saw Paul McGann return as the Eighth Doctor on television for the first time since 1996. The final piece of filming for the special took place on 3 October, five months after principal photography wrapped, with Peter Capaldi filming his cameo, concurrent with filming his official first appearance for "The Time of the Doctor".

Miniatures constructed by Mike Tucker and his company The Model Unit were used in filming for the Time War sequences, including a model of a Time Lord staser cannon and the War Doctor flying his TARDIS into and subsequently destroying several Daleks. The Dalek models used were 18-inch voice interactive toys produced by Character Options. The technique of using Dalek toys as models for filming was a common method of presenting entire armies in the classic series.

Marketing

Minisode
"The Night of the Doctor", an additional 7-minute special, was released on 14 November 2013, and featured the Eighth Doctor (Paul McGann)'s regeneration into the War Doctor (John Hurt). Another 4-minute special, entitled "The Last Day", was released on 20 November 2013 and saw the start of the Fall of Arcadia.

Trailers
The first trailer for the special was shown to attendees of San Diego Comic-Con in July 2013. The BBC's decision not to release the trailer online to international fans was met with controversy. On 26 July, the BBC responded to criticisms by saying the trailer was intended to be exclusive to Comic-Con attendees and that content for all other audiences would be forthcoming at a later date.

On 28 September, the BBC revealed that the trailer for the special had been shot and was in post-production. On 19 October 2013, a specially made teaser trailer, directed by Matt Losasso, was shown on BBC One, and was then subsequently posted online. It contained icons from the history of the show and had a monologue by Matt Smith, as well as body doubles and CGI to create shots of previous Doctors.

A clip from "The Day of the Doctor" was shown during the BBC's Children in Need telethon on Friday 15 November. The official trailer for the episode aired in the United Kingdom at 8 pm GMT on 9 November. Due to the leak of a trailer earlier on 9 November on BBC Latin America's Facebook page, the BBC officially released it ahead of schedule. A second official trailer was released shortly thereafter.

Furthermore, before the release of the main trailers, a short clip previewed the Eleventh Doctor and Clara examining a seemingly impossible painting. On 10 November 2013, a short clip of the Eleventh Doctor announcing "The clock is ticking" interrupted a BBC One ident. This was followed on Monday 11 November by another ident interruption, with the Eleventh Doctor stating "It's all been leading to this..."

Viral marketing
On 28 September, the BBC unveiled a Twitter hashtag (#SaveTheDay) and an ident that was used to promote the special. Respectively, the hashtag and the ident were shown before and after the premiere of Atlantis on BBC One. The hashtag was used to reveal all subsequent promotional material. On 7 November 2013, a video starring Smith in character as the Doctor was released promoting the hashtag, promising exclusive content. A website was launched to reveal the content.

Broadcast and reception

The BBC broadcast the episode in 94 countries simultaneously, to avoid plot leaks. It earned a Guinness World Record for the world's largest ever simulcast of a TV drama. While not a technical simulcast of BBC One, a number of non-English translations were also transmitted at the same time as the BBC's broadcast.

The British Board of Film Classification rated the episode PG for mild violence and threat. The Australian Classification Board also rated the episode PG for "mild science fiction themes and violence", noting there was "very mild impact" with regards to sexual themes. The episode broadcast at 7:50pm in the UK, and was preceded and followed by other Doctor Who related programmes and broadcasts, including broadcast of an after-party.

Canadian provincial film censors rated "The Day of the Doctor" PG in Alberta, G in Manitoba and G in Quebec.

The episode aired in over 100 countries on either 23 or 24 November 2013 in cinemas and on television.

Television
The episode originally aired on BBC One, BBC One HD, and in 3D on BBC One HD Red Button. It aired on Prime in New Zealand, BBC America in the United States, ABC1 in Australia, and on Space in Canada. In English speaking Asia and Africa, it was released by BBC Entertainment.

Cinemas
The episode was originally released in Cineworld, Vue, Odeon, and independent cinemas. It was released in Hoyts, Event, Village and limited independent cinemas in Australia. It aired in Cineplex cinemas in Canada and in Event Cinemas in New Zealand. In the United States it was released only at AMC, Century, Cinemark and Regal cinemas. In Mexico, the episode was released exclusively in 20 select Cinemark 3D theatres.

The cinema version played with an introduction featuring Dan Starkey as Strax and John Hurt, David Tennant and Matt Smith as the Doctors, respectively.

Critical reception

"The Day of the Doctor" received critical acclaim. On Rotten Tomatoes, the special has 100% approval rating based on 18 reviews, and an average rating of 9.41/10. The website's critical consensus reads, "Doctor Who: The Day of the Doctor is a joyous marker in the series, uniting two of the most beloved Time Lords and setting them together on a rousing adventure full of crowd-pleasing nods and winks." Ben Lawrence of The Daily Telegraph gave the special five stars, calling it "charming, eccentric and very, very British." Den of Geek's Simon Brew praised the special, calling it "terrific", and stating that it was "pulsating with comedy, ambition, and top to bottom entertainment." However, he comments negatively on the handling of the Zygon subplot, stating their part “just fizzled out a little, after a strong build up”, and commented that the viewer may have mixed feelings on the revelation that the Doctor saved Gailfrey, rather than destroy it, stating it felt “like years of darkness was sort-of sorted out in 20 minutes (albeit with no little gravitas)”. Jon Cooper of The Mirror gave the episode five stars, stating that it "not only gives hardcore fans a beautiful reinvention of their favourite show but also gives casual viewers a stonking story and a reminder why we all love this show so much." SFX gave the episode five out of five stars, noting that it was not perfect but those were "churlish niggles". The magazine praised the three Doctors and commented on how it linked the past, present, and future of the show.

Mashable's Chris Taylor stated that the episode is "one designed to please fans and newcomers alike," and that it "shows why the Doctor is finding his way into ever more homes and hearts." The Guardians Viv Grospok criticised various elements of the episode, commenting that she was not certain what was intended by the comedic dialogue and the episode's shifting points of view and disliked the revelation Piper wasn't playing her original character, Rose Tyler, although she eventually concluded that "it was all worth it."

Ratings
Overnight figures revealed that the episode had a total of 10.18 million viewers for the live broadcast in the United Kingdom. When time-shifted viewers were taken into account, the figure rose to a total of 12.8 million viewers, which makes it the highest rating since "The Next Doctor" (2008), which had a total of 13.1 million viewers. For the week, it was the number one most-watched series on British television, a feat only two other Doctor Who episodes had ever achieved. The box office takings for the cinema screenings totalled £1.7m, which placed it at number three in the UK film chart for the week, behind The Hunger Games: Catching Fire and Gravity. In addition, "The Day of the Doctor" became the most requested show within 24 hours on BBC iPlayer with 1.27 million requests, which rose to 2.9 million by 3 December 2013. It was named the most-watched drama of 2013 based on the final viewing figures. It received an Appreciation Index of 88.

The live simulcast on BBC America had a total audience of 2.4 million viewers, briefly becoming the largest audience in the channel's history, until the broadcast of "The Time of the Doctor" just over a month later.

Worldwide, cinema screenings brought $10.2 million at the box office. The cinema screenings in the USA, on a total of 660 screens nationwide, took a total of US$4.8m (approx £3m) at the box office. The special had a total of 1.95 million viewers for its two broadcasts in Australia, with 590,000 watching the live broadcast on ABC1, and another 1.36 million watching the repeat at 7:30pm, while the cinema box office takings totalled AU$1.54m, putting it at number three in the Australian film chart. In addition, the episode received 51,000 plays on the online ABC iview in a single day. A total of 42,000 viewers watched the simultaneous screening in New Zealand, with a total of 177,510 viewers watching the 8.30pm repeat, which was Prime's highest rating show for the day. The figure includes live and timeshifted viewers. This means there was a total of 219,510 viewers for all screenings. A total of 1.7 million viewers watched the two broadcasts on Canadian channel Space, making it the most watched entertainment programme in Canada on the day, with the 1.1m watching the live broadcast at 2.50pm EST being the channel's largest ever audience.

Social analytics website SecondSync revealed that Doctor Who generated almost 500,000 tweets on Twitter during its broadcast, with the peak number of tweets occurring at the beginning of the broadcast, at 12,939 tweets per minute.

Awards and nominations
"The Day of the Doctor" won the publicly voted Radio Times Audience Award at the BAFTA Awards in May 2014. "The Day of the Doctor" was also nominated for the 2014 Hugo Award for Best Dramatic Presentation (Short Form).

In a poll conducted by Doctor Who Magazine, "The Day of the Doctor" was voted as the most popular story in the 50 years of the show.

Home media
"The Day of the Doctor" was released on DVD and 3D Blu-ray on 2 December 2013 in the UK. It was released on 4 December 2013 in Australia, and on 10 December 2013 in North America. The special was re-released on DVD and Blu-ray on 8 September 2014 as part of a "50th Anniversary Collectors Boxset" alongside "The Name of the Doctor", "The Night of the Doctor", "The Time of the Doctor", "An Adventure in Space and Time" and "The Five(ish) Doctors Reboot". This re-release features new footage of the specials' read-through. The special is streamed on Amazon Prime.

Soundtrack

Selected pieces of score from "The Day of the Doctor", as composed by Murray Gold, were released on 24 November 2014 by Silva Screen Records. The album includes material not used in the final episode.

In print

A novelisation of this story written by Steven Moffat including "The Night of the Doctor" storyline was released in paperback and digital formats on 5 April 2018 as part of the Target Collection.

See also
 The Five(ish) Doctors Reboot, a parody tie-in to this episode.

Notes

References

Filming locations

All filming locations are extracted from Doctor Who Magazine'''s Special Edition Volume 38: The Year of the Doctor: The Official Guide to Doctor Who''s 50th Anniversary.

External links

 Hidden items in the 19 October 2013 trailer

Fiction set in 1562
2013 British television episodes
2013 in Canadian television
Television episodes written by Steven Moffat
Eleventh Doctor episodes
Tenth Doctor episodes
War Doctor stories
Twelfth Doctor episodes
Doctor Who multi-Doctor stories
Dalek television stories
British television specials
Cultural depictions of Elizabeth I
Television episodes about space warfare
Anniversary television episodes
Doctor Who pseudohistorical serials
Doctor Who stories set on Earth
3D television shows
UNIT serials
Doctor Who serials novelised by Steven Moffat
Eighth Doctor novels
Novels by Steven Moffat
Television episodes set in London
Television episodes set in the 16th century
Doctor Who regeneration stories